Sheikh Ibrahim Mudayris, also spelled Mdeiras, is a Palestinian imam. He has a close following in the city of Gaza; indeed a live sermon by him was broadcast on official Palestinian Authority Television on 21 March 2003 from Sheikh Ijlin Mosque in Gaza.
An Islamist, in this famous sermon he said "Oh Muslims! Wake up from your slumber! It is your faith that is under attack!" and said that "America will be annihilated".

References

Palestinian imams
People from Gaza City
Living people
Palestinian Islamists
Year of birth missing (living people)